Sloboda is a rural locality (a village) in Osinovskoye Rural Settlement of Vinogradovsky District, Arkhangelsk Oblast, Russia. The population was 64 as of 2010.

Geography 
Sloboda is located on the Severnaya Dvina River, 7 km north of Bereznik (the district's administrative centre) by road. Verkhneye Chazhestrovo is the nearest rural locality.

References 

Rural localities in Vinogradovsky District